The Bogeyman is a 1953 West German comedy crime film directed by Carl Boese and starring Liselotte Pulver, Hans Reiser and Harald Paulsen. It was shot at the Wandsbek Studios in Hamburg. The film's sets were designed by the art director Mathias Matthies.

Plot 
In the small English town of Blackmoor, a congress is being held by the "Millionaires' Association". In order to guarantee the well-heeled participants' safety, numerous private detectives are hired as security guarantors. Despite this massive protective presence, a clever gang of crooks who call themselves "The Night Ghost" manage to break into the hotel safe and steal considerable sums of money. This now calls the bright maid Trixie into action, who loves to devour crime novels and was just waiting to finally experience an exciting adventure herself. 

Trixie immediately gets to work and does some research on her own. She is joined by a young up-and-coming author who has already achieved some fame as a crime novelist, Conny Cooper. In fact, the two track down the thieves, and finally they manage to break up the gang and put their members, including the somewhat dumb guys Ladislaus and Gustav, under lock and key. Trixie is given a lavish reward and has also won Conny Cooper's heart.

Cast
 Liselotte Pulver as Trixie
 Hans Reiser as Conny Cooper
 Harald Paulsen as Ladislaus
 Elena Luber as Yvette
 Hubert von Meyerinck as Hoteldirektor
 Paul Verhoeven as Peppercorn
 Bully Buhlan
 Walter Gross as Gustav
 Heinz Klevenow as Tigerjim
 Bruno Klockmann as Butterfield
 Christine Mylius as Miss Moneymaker
 Hans Schwarz Jr. as Robby
 Josef Sieber
 Horst von Otto

References

Bibliography 
 Bock, Hans-Michael & Bergfelder, Tim. The Concise CineGraph. Encyclopedia of German Cinema. Berghahn Books, 2009.

External links 
 

1953 films
1950s crime comedy films
German crime comedy films
West German films
1950s German-language films
Films directed by Carl Boese
1953 comedy films
German black-and-white films
1950s German films
Films shot at Wandsbek Studios